Jin Wan Plaza 2 is a skyscraper in Tianjin, China. The 58-story building was completed in 2015, construction having begun in 2011.

See also
Skyscraper design and construction
List of tallest buildings in China

References

 
Buildings and structures in Tianjin
Office buildings completed in 2015